The Gudanji, otherwise known as the Kotandji or Ngandji, are an indigenous Australian people of the Northern Territory.

Language
The Gudanji were formerly thought to speak a Ngurlun language, belonging to the eastern Mirndi languages group of non-Pama Nyungan family, one that was mutually intelligible with Wambaya.

Country
The western extension lay about the head of Newcastle Creek, while their southern frontier ran to the Barkly Tableland area of Anthony Lagoon and Eva Downs. Neighbouring tribes where reckoning clockwise from the north, the Yanyuwa, with the Garrwa on their eastern flank, the Wambaya to their south, the Ngarnka east and the Binbinga to their northeast.

History of contact
Before 1900, the Gudanjii were on the move penetrating into the Binbinga lands that lay to their northeast.

Alternative names

 Anga
 Angee (mishearing)
 Gnanji (scribal error)
 Gudanji, Godangee
 Gundangee
 Kakaringa (Tjingili exonym with the sense of "easterners"(kakara = east))
 Kudenji
 Kutandji, Kudandji, Koodanjee, Koodangie
 Kutanjtjii (Alyawarre exonym)
 Nandi
 Ngandji
 Nganji, Ngangi

Source:

Notes

Citations

Sources

Aboriginal peoples of the Northern Territory